This is a list of fictional doctors (characters who use the appellation "doctor", medical and otherwise), organized by the television show and character's name.

0-9

A

B

C

D

E

F

G

H

I

J

L

M

N

O

P

Q

R

S

T

W

X

Y

Z

 
Lists of physicians